Waranwallqa (Quechua wara trousers, pants / bee, wallqa collar, Hispanicized spelling Huaranhuallcca) is a mountain in the Andes of Peru, about  high. It is situated in the Ayacucho Region, Cangallo Province, Paras District. Waranwallqa lies south-west of the mountain Saywa Q'asa, south of the mountain Rit'ipata and north-east of a small lake named Yanaqucha (Quechua for "black lake", Hispanicized Yanacocha).

References

Mountains of Peru
Mountains of Ayacucho Region